A bush mechanic (Australian slang) is somebody who out of necessity and with immediate available materials, is able to solve practical problems using sometimes untraditional and inventive techniques. Generally an inventive technique is required due to the lack of proper resources or the other constraints in solving the problem using traditional means (for example, using a tree branch to fix a broken axle).

Bush mechanics may also be known as "bushies".

The bush mechanic promotes competent behaviour and has a strong emphasis on practical knowledge and wisdom instead of technical skills. 

The 2001 Australian television show Bush Mechanics displayed bush mechanic skills used by a group of Indigenous men from Warlpiri Country as they travelled through the rugged central region of Australia.

See also 
Culture of Australia
Shadetree mechanic
Bush Mechanics, the Australian television documentary series (2001)
MacGyver

References

External links 
Bush Mechanics Site

Australian slang
Mechanics (trade)
Rural culture in Oceania